The University of Windsor (U of W, UWindsor, or UWin) is a public research university in Windsor, Ontario, Canada. It is Canada's southernmost university. It has approximately 12,000 full-time and part-time undergraduate students and 4,000 graduate students. The university was incorporated by the provincial government in 1962 and has more than 135,000 alumni.

The University of Windsor has nine faculties, including the Faculty of Arts, Humanities and Social Sciences, the Faculty of Education, the Faculty of Engineering, Odette School of Business, the Faculty of Graduate Studies, the Faculty of Human Kinetics, the Faculty of Law, the Faculty of Nursing, and the Faculty of Science. Through its faculties and independent schools, the university has demonstrated its primary research focuses of automotive, environmental, social justice, and international trade research. In recent years, it has increasingly begun focusing on health, natural science, and entrepreneurship research.

History

The university dates to the founding of the Roman Catholic Assumption College in Windsor, Ontario in 1857. Assumption College, a primarily theological institution, was founded by the Society of Jesuits in 1857. The Basilian Fathers assumed control of the college in 1870. The college grew steadily, expanding its curriculum and affiliating with several other colleges over the years.

In 1919, Assumption College in Windsor affiliated with the University of Western Ontario. Originally, Assumption was one of the largest colleges associated with the University of Western Ontario. Escalating costs forced Assumption University, a denominational university, to become a public institution to qualify for public support. It was granted university status in 1953.

In 1950, Assumption College welcomed its first women students. In 1953, through an Act of the Ontario Legislature, Assumption College received its own university powers, and ended its affiliation with the University of Western Ontario. In 1956, the institution's name was changed to Assumption University of Windsor, by an Act of the Ontario Legislature, with Reverend Eugene Carlisle LeBel, C.S.B. named as its first President. The recently created non-denominational Essex College, led by Frank A. DeMarco, became an affiliate, with responsibility for the Pure Sciences, Applied Sciences, as well as the Schools of Business Administration and Nursing. (Essex College's Arms and Badge were registered with the Canadian Heraldic Authority on March 15, 2007.)

In the early 1960s, the City of Windsor's growth and demands for higher education led to further restructuring. A petition was made to the province of Ontario for the creation of a non-denominational University of Windsor by the board of governors and regents of Assumption University and the board of directors of Essex College. The University of Windsor came into existence through its incorporation under an Act of the Legislative Assembly of Ontario on December 19, 1962. The transition from an historic Roman Catholic university to a non-denominational provincial university was an unprecedented development.

On July 1, 1963, the entire campus with all of its facilities and faculty became known as the University of Windsor. As a 'federated member', Assumption University remained as an integrated institution, granting degrees only in its Faculty of Theology. Father Eugene Carlisle LeBel from Assumption became the inaugural president of the University of Windsor, and Frank A. DeMarco, who had been holding both positions of Principal, as well as Dean of Applied Science at Essex College, became the inaugural Vice President. The university's coats of arms were designed by heraldic expert Alan Beddoe.

Six months later, Assumption University of Windsor made affiliation agreements with Holy Redeemer College (now Académie Sainte-Cécile), Canterbury College and the new Iona College (affiliated with the United Church of Canada). Canterbury College became the first Anglican college in the world to affiliate with a Roman Catholic University.

In 1964, when E.C. LeBel retired, Dr. John Francis Leddy was appointed president of the University of Windsor, and presided over a period of significant growth. From 1967 to 1977, Windsor grew from approximately 1,500 to 8,000 full-time students. In the 1980s and early 1990s, this growth continued. Among the new buildings erected were the Odette Business Building and the CAW Student Centre.

Enrolment reached record heights in Fall 2003 with the elimination of Grade 13 (Ontario Academic Credit) in Ontario. The university has developed a number of partnerships with local businesses and industry, such as the University of Windsor/Chrysler Canada Ltd. Automotive Research and Development Centre and Maple Leaf Sports and Entertainment.

Campus

Located in Canada's traditional "automotive capital" across the border from Detroit, the campus is near the United States and its busy port of entry to and from the United States. It is framed by the Ambassador Bridge to the west and the Detroit River to the north.

The campus features a small arboretum, which represents most of the species from the Carolinian forest. Campus is approximately a 10-minute drive from downtown Windsor. The university has moved some academic programs to the downtown core, including Social Work, the Executive and Professional Education program, Music and Fine Arts. Due to its historical roots in multiple religious institutions, the university's campus has many examples of Christian architecture in addition to its modern flagship buildings like the $10-million dollar Joyce Entrepreneurship Centre.

The War Memorial Hall (more generally known as Memorial Hall) is a landmark building used as classrooms, labs, and offices. Memorial Hall honours alumni who had enlisted and died in the First World War, and in the Second World War. A bronze tablet remembers the alumni of Assumption College who died in the Second World War.

The Joyce Entrepreneurship Centre (formerly the “Innovation Centre”) is located on the main campus, on the south side of Wyandotte street. This building houses the EPICentre, and WEtech Alliance. The EPICentre (Entrepreneurship, Practice, and Innovation Centre) is a University of Windsor organization focused on providing students and alumni with the expertise and resources necessary to pursue entrepreneurial goals. The EPICentre is part of the Ontario Centres of Excellence and provides education, mentorship, office space and varying levels of funding to help support startup business. WEtech Alliance is a similar organization, also being an Ontario Centre of Excellence, whose main focus is to support technology startup companies. They provide services to technology startups in the Windsor-Essex and Chatham-Kent regions, not exclusively to students and alumni from the University of Windsor.

The CAW Student Centre is the main, comprehensive centre servicing all student needs. It houses a large food court and the main campus bookstore. Also within the CAW Centre: Student Health Services, a dental office, counselling services, a photographer, a pharmacy, the University of Windsor Students' Alliance (UWSA), a Multi-Faith Space, the campus community radio station CJAM-FM, and an information desk. A large public area beside the food court is available for clubs and informational booths to be set up on certain days. For example, during October there is a period where many Canadian law schools set up booths with representatives who answer questions and provide information to undergraduate students.

The St. Denis Centre, at the south end of campus on College Avenue, is the major athletic and recreational facility for students. It has a weight room, exercise facilities, and a swimming pool. The new South Campus Stadium built for the 2005 Pan American Junior Games is beside the St. Denis Centre - which also has dressing rooms for Lancer teams - and borders Huron Church Road, the major avenue to and from the border crossing. The athletics department has become well known for Track & Field, and Men and Women's Basketball.

In February 2018, the university announced plans to build a new athletic centre, titled the Lancer Sport and Recreation Centre. The new facility will cost $73 million and be 130,000-square-feet. Unlike the current St. Dennis Centre, there will be many separate sections of the facility to host different athletic resources; such as a new gymnasium, pool, fitness gym and many multi-purpose rooms, as opposed to a single general-purpose space. Construction for the facility began in October, 2018.

In June 2019, a new research facility opened up on the campus. The new facility, called the Essex Centre of Research (or CORe) is built on to the south side of the existing Essex Hall science facility. It is an open concept 46,000-square-feet facility, featuring state-of-the-art labs and will primarily be used as a research facility.

Student residences

The university houses students in three residence halls on campus. There is also one unused hall, MacDonald, and a fifth residence undergoing construction as of 2023.

Alumni Hall is home to Beyond First Year and First Year students (coming directly from High School). Alumni Hall has co-ed floors and it is a suite-style residence where suites have two bedrooms that share a kitchenette, and three-piece bathroom. Beyond First Year students are not assigned in the same suite as First Year students (coming directly from High School).

Cartier Hall is home to First Year undergraduate students (coming directly from High School). Cartier Hall has co-ed floors, two students share one room and four students share one washroom.

Laurier Hall is home to Beyond First Year students. Laurier Hall has single rooms on single gender and/or co-ed floors.

The formerly named MacDonald Hall, renamed to Residence Hall West in 2021, has stood vacant since 2021 and is expected to be demolished.

The University is currently expanding is residence offerings with a new 160,000 square-foot, six-storey, 440-room building featuring dining facilities and other student amenities. It is expected to be ready for occupancy in 2025.

Academics

Windsor offers more than 120 majors and minors and 55 master's and doctoral degree programs across nine faculties:
 Faculty of Arts, Humanities & Social Science
Argumentation Studies; Anthrozoology; Liberal Arts and Professional Studies; Communication, Media, and Film; Creative Arts; Dramatic Art; English Language, Literature, and Creative Writing; History; Languages, Literature and Culture; Philosophy; Political Science; Psychology; Sociology, Anthropology, and Criminology; Social Work; Women's and Gender Studies
 Faculty of Education
 Faculty of Engineering
Civil Engineering; Electrical and Computer Engineering; Environmental Engineering; Industrial and Manufacturing and Systems Engineering; and Mechanical, Automotive, Aerospace and Materials Engineering.
 Odette School of Business
Accounting, Marketing, Management, Human Resources, Finance and Strategy
 Faculty of Graduate Studies
 Faculty of Human Kinetics
Sport Studies, Movement Science and Sport Management
 Faculty of Law
 Faculty of Nursing
 Faculty of Science
Biological Sciences, Chemistry and Biochemistry, Computer Science, Earth and Environmental Sciences, Economics, Mathematics and Statistics, Physics, General Science.

University of Windsor also provides Inter-Faculty Programs offering cross-departmental majors like Forensics, Environmental studies and Arts & Science concentration.
There are nine cooperative education programs for 1,100 students.

The Faculty of Law is one of six in Ontario, and has a major teaching and research focus on Social Justice and Access to Justice issues. It publishes two law journals, the Faculty led Access to Justice and the student run, peer-reviewed Windsor Review of Legal and Social Issues.

The faculty offers a variety of courses reflecting its research focus. Law students may study Human Rights Law, Poverty Law, Aboriginal rights law and legal issues affecting women, minorities and children. There is also a strong research emphasis on criminal law, with many notable Faculty of Law professors having extensive experience both in academics and during their careers when on trial. The faculty, in conjunction with Legal Aid Ontario, runs a downtown Windsor community legal clinic called Legal Assistance Windsor staffed with supervising lawyers, law students, and social workers; it is aimed at meeting the legal needs of low-income residents and people traditionally denied access to justice. This clinic operates in all areas of law that affect those it is mandated to serve, including landlord and tenant law.

The University of Windsor runs a second legal clinic, Community Legal Aid, at the corner of Sunset and University. This clinic is a Student Legal Aid Services Society (SLASS) clinic, which is staffed primarily by volunteer law students and overseen by supervising lawyers, called review counsel. This clinic operates primarily in the areas of criminal law, landlord and tenant law, and small claims court. The clinic offers free legal services to those who qualify financially, as well as all students of the University of Windsor.

The faculty also has a joint, ABA-Approved J.D.degree program with the University of Detroit Mercy. The program is completed in three years with students taking courses at both the University of Windsor and the University of Detroit Mercy. Upon completion students earn both Canadian and American legal accreditation and can pursue licensing in any Province in Canada (aside from civil law in Quebec) and any state in the United States of America.

The University of Windsor's philosophy department is known for its work in informal logic, and regularly hosts an international argumentation conference through the Ontario Society for the Study of Argumentation. Students, faculty, and visiting researchers collaborate in the inter-departmental research group the Centre for Research in Reasoning, Argumentation, and Rhetoric. As of 2016, the University of Windsor offers an interdisciplinary PhD in Argumentation Studies, the only graduate program in North America with a focus on this field.

As of 2008, the University of Windsor is also home to a satellite campus of the Schulich School of Medicine & Dentistry of the University of Western Ontario.

Student life
International students from nearly 100 countries make up approximately 23% of the student population.

Despite the large number of international students, the majority of students are domestic and come from Windsor and Essex County.

Greek Life on campus is smaller at the university, but includes one International Fraternity: Sigma Chi; one International Sorority: Delta Zeta, and one National Sorority: Delta Alpha Theta.

In addition to the newspaper The Lance, which is partially funded by the UWSA and provides stories written by student volunteers, students at the University of Windsor publish several independent publications. The Student Movement is a grassroots, independent, student run paper providing a critical discourse towards administration and the UWSA. The Issue is a student run electronic publication covering international social justice issues.

Leddy Library is the main campus library. The Paul Martin Law Library serves the Faculty of Law. The Canadian Auto Workers Union helped to build the CAW Student Centre which is a central meeting place for students. The university has a unique agreement with the Ambassador Duty-Free Store at Canada's busiest border crossing which provides student jobs, 400 parking spaces, and an annual cash annuity to the school.

Students also take advantage of the downtown area conveniently down the street. From restaurants to printing shops, to Bubble Tea Cafés, there are a variety of shops of interest to students.

Student unions

There are three student unions at Windsor. The University of Windsor Students' Alliance, otherwise known as the UWSA, represents all full-time undergraduate students at the University of Windsor, located in Windsor, Ontario, Canada. It provides services such as an Office of Student Empowerment, financial awards, a food pantry, representation on various University of Windsor bodies, a weekly student newspaper, The Lance, and various other services and programs.

The Organization of Part-time University Students (OPUS) represents part-time undergraduate students, while the Graduate Student Society represents all graduate students at the university. All three student unions are affiliated with the Canadian Federation of Students.

Athletics

The University is represented in U Sports by the Windsor Lancers. The Lancers play within the Ontario University Athletics conference. The University of Windsor Stadium plays host to a variety of intercollegiate sports including:

 Football
 Soccer
 Outdoor track and field
 Basketball
 Volleyball
 Curling
 Ball Hockey
 European Handball
 Flag Football
 Table Tennis
 Indoor Rugby
 Windsor Lancers Ice Hockey team plays at the South Windsor Arena.

Scholarships
The university joined Project Hero, a scholarship program cofounded by General (Ret'd) Rick Hillier, for the families of fallen Canadian Forces members.

The university established Rosa Schreiber Award with the assistance of former University of Windsor Professor Economics, Alan A. Brown. From the university's Senate Committee on Student Awards: The competition award is open to arts or social science students in Year 2 or beyond. Applicants must submit a 1,500–2,000-word essay on some aspect of moral courage. Submission must be made to the Office of Student Awards. This competition will be held in alternate years. It was established in 1995 to honour Rosa Schreiber, an Austrian freedom fighter who risked her life to help others during World War II.

Memberships
It is a member of the National Conference of Canadian Universities and Colleges, the University Articulation Board of Ontario, the International Association of Universities, and the Association of the British Commonwealth.  The Lance (Student Newspaper) is a member of CUP.

Federated or affiliated colleges
 Assumption University, a graduate college that offers a degree in Pastoral Ministry and Religious Education
 Canterbury College, a liberal arts college within the U of W with a Christian background
 Iona College, a small theological college

Notable people

Alumni

 Lorne Abony, businessman
 Navdeep Bains, Liberal MP for Mississauga—Malton, and Minister of Innovation, Science and Economic Development
 James Bondy, entertainer, co-star of Ribert and Robert's Wonderworld
 Joe Bowen, sportscaster, "The Voice of the Toronto Maple Leafs"
 Patrick Brown, former Leader of the Opposition in Ontario and Mayor of Brampton
 Warren Christie, actor
 Antoni Cimolino, general director of the Stratford Festival
 Joe Comuzzi, former Member of Parliament and cabinet minister
 Nicole Corriero, all-time collegiate hockey record holder for most goals in a season (59 goals, tied with Mike Donnelly)
 Murray Costello, retired NHL player, president of Hockey Canada, inducted into Hockey Hall of Fame, the IIHF Hall of Fame, Canada's Sports Hall of Fame, and is an Officer of the Order of Canada, and a recipient of the Order of Hockey in Canada.
 Dean Del Mastro, former Member of Parliament
 Drew Dilkens, mayor of Windsor, Ontario
 Dwight Duncan, former Member of Provincial Parliament and former Minister of Finance
 Colm Feore, actor
 Eddie Francis, former mayor of Windsor, Ontario
 Arjei Franklin, receiver, Winnipeg Blue Bombers, CFL
 Douglas Fregin, co-founder of BlackBerry Limited
 Stewart Friesen, Racecar driver, NASCAR.
 Roger Gallaway, former Member of Parliament
 Mark Hominick, UFC fighter
 Marie Howe, poet
 Dario Hunter, the first Muslim-born person to be ordained a rabbi.
 Maureen Jennings, novelist
 Ronalda Jones, writer and actress
 Akshay Kumar, Bollywood actor
 Thomas LaSorda, CEO of Chrysler Group
 Hilary M. Lips, Emerita professor and research faculty in Psychology at Radford University
 Frank Mahovlich, NHL Hall-of-Famer and Canadian Senator
 Stephen Mandel, Alberta Minister of Health and former mayor of Edmonton, Alberta
 Dylan Mandlsohn, stand-up comedian
 Sergio Marchionne, CEO of Fiat Chrysler Automobiles, chairman of CNH Industrial and CEO of Ferrari
 Joe Mimran, Canadian fashion designer and entrepreneur, launched the Club Monaco and Joe Fresh brands
 Thomas Moore, author
 Hodan Nalayeh, media executive and entrepreneur
 Rick Nicholls, Member of Provincial Parliament for Chatham-Kent—Leamington, Ontario
 Rob Nicholson, Minister of National Defence of Canada
 Richard Peddie, former president and CEO of Maple Leaf Sports & Entertainment
 Joel Quenneville, former coach of the Chicago Blackhawks of the NHL
 Carlos Queiroz, professional soccer manager
 John Redmond C.S.B., Basilian priest, teacher, principal, athletic director and coach at Michael Power/St. Joseph High School.
 Michael Rotenberg, film and television producer
 Lynsay Sands, author
 Douglas Stenton OC, archaeologist, former Director of Heritage for the Nunavut Department of Culture and Heritage
 Amanda Tapping, actor
 Anna Maria Tremonti, CBC Radio and CBC Television reporter
 Daniel Victor, musician and founder of Neverending White Lights
 Tessa Virtue, professional ice dancer, most decorated figure skater in Olympic history
 Bob Weeks, TSN golf analyst, member of Canadian Golf Hall of Fame and Canadian Curling Hall of Fame
 Nigel Shawn Williams, actor
 Alexander Zonjic, professional flutist
 Stanley E. Zin, William R. Berkley Professor of Economics and Business, New York University, and Frisch Medal winner

Faculty

 Iain Baxter&, Professor Emeritus School of Visual Arts, award-winning Canadian photographer, painter, sculptor, installation artist, and conceptual artist
 Di Brandt, former Professor and poet
 Alan A. Brown, Professor of Economics, founder of Omicron Delta Epsilon (ODE), international honor society in Economics
Tricia Carmichael, Professor of Chemistry
 John N. Deck, former professor, Plotinus Scholar
 Craig Fleisher, Professor of Management and Windsor Research Leadership Chair, Odette School of Business, author of several key books on business and competitive intelligence
 Alistair MacLeod, Author, Arts Faculty Professor, and award-winning Canadian author
 Marshall McLuhan, former professor, Canadian educator, philosopher, and scholar
 Eugene McNamara, Professor Emeritus of English, writer, and poet, initiated the Creative Writing Program which has graduated a number of award-winning authors, former editor of the Windsor Review
 Lakshman Marasinghe, Professor Emeritus of Law, Chairman of the Law Commission of Sri Lanka
 André Narbonne, professor of English and writer
 Joyce Carol Oates, former visiting English Department Faculty member from 1968 to 1978 now at Princeton University, American Author
 Howard Pawley (retired), former NDP Premier of Manitoba (1981–1988)
 Ralph Simmonds, judge on the Supreme Court of Western Australia, once a professor of law at University of Windsor
 Vern Stenlund, Professor of Education, Coach men's hockey, former NHL player and co-author of hockey books with Bobby Orr

Presidents
 Eugene Carlisle LeBel, 1963–1964
 John Francis Leddy, 1964–1978
 Mervyn Franklin, 1978–1984
 Ronald W. Ianni, 1984–1997
 Ross H. Paul, 1998–2008
 Alan Wildeman, 2008–2018
 Douglas Kneale, 2018-2019 (interim)
 Robert Gordon, 2019–present

Chancellors
 Keiller Mackay, 1964–1970  
 Lucien Lamoureu, 1971–1977
 Richard Rohmer. 1978–1989
 William Somerville, 1989–1993
 Charles Clark, 1993–1996
 Richard Rohmer, 1996–1997
 Frederic Jackma, 1997–2006
 Edward Lumley, 2006–2019
 Mary Jo Haddad, 2019–present

See also

 Canadian Centre for Alternatives to Animal Methods
 Higher education in Ontario
 List of universities in Ontario

Notes

References

External links

 

 
Educational institutions established in 1962
1962 establishments in Ontario
Universities in Ontario